The serra finch (Embernagra longicauda), also known as the pale-throated Pampa-finch, is a species of bird traditionally placed in the family Emberizidae, though recent research suggests it is either very close to the Thraupidae or even part thereof. It is endemic to Brazil. Its natural habitats are dry savanna and subtropical or tropical high-altitude shrubland. It is becoming rare due to habitat loss.

References

serra finch
Birds of the Cerrado
Endemic birds of Brazil
serra finch
Taxonomy articles created by Polbot